Lights and Shadows is a 1914 American silent drama film directed by Joe De Grasse, starring Tom Forman, Pauline Bush and Lon Chaney. The screenplay was written by Ida May Park (De Grasse's wife). A still exists showing Lon Chaney as Bentley, just before he deserts his wife in the film. The picture is now considered to be a lost film.

Plot
Eve, a poor flower girl, learns that her mother, a singer, had married Bentley (Lon Chaney), the son of a rich man, but Bentley's father disinherited him for marrying a stage performer. So Bentley deserted his wife the night Eve was born, leaving the young mother penniless, and their nurse Matilde raised the girl after her mother died. When the old nurse falls ill, Eve gets a job in a cafe selling flowers to raise money to help the nurse. There she meets Victor Austin who makes advances towards her, but she manages to escape from him. When she returns home, she finds the nurse dead.

Eve discovers some old letters that she thinks could aid her in locating her deadbeat father. Along the way, she is robbed of her ticket and all of her money and joins up with a theatrical troupe who feel sorry for her. The star of the company, James Gordon, falls in love with her, but she learns that he is married and runs away. Gordon later receives an important offer from the New York stage. Meanwhile Eve manages to find her father Bentley who has since come into great wealth. He plans to force Eve to marry the loutish Victor Austin, but then Eve learns that Gordon's wife, who never really loved him, has died. Gordon is now free to remarry. Eve travels to New York and finds Gordon at the New York theatre where they are happily reunited.

Cast
 Pauline Bush in a dual role as both Eve and Eve's mother
 Lon Chaney as Bentley, Eve's deadbeat father
 Tom Forman as the loutish Victor Austin
 Joe De Grasse as James Gordon
 Laura Oakley
 Betty Schade
 Beatrice Van
 William C. Dowlan
 Helen Wright

Reception
"This story is slightly too complicated to make a good picture and too much time is covered. The ending is abrupt and one is left to speculate upon the final outcome."—Motion Picture News

"This offering is peculiar in construction, and while not uninteresting, contains much of a semi-morbid character. It lacks bright, attractive scenes and is brought to a very abrupt close. The acting and photography are good."—Moving Picture World

See also
List of lost films

References

External links

1914 films
1914 short films
1914 drama films
American silent short films
American black-and-white films
Lost American films
Films directed by Joseph De Grasse
Universal Pictures short films
Silent American drama films
1914 lost films
Lost drama films
1910s American films
1910s English-language films
American drama short films